Mundial is a Brazilian manufacturing company. Mundial produces beauty care implements, such as scissors, files and tweezers, and apparel fasteners, such as buttons, rivets and eyelets. Mundial is the result of the merger of Eberle S.A., founded in 1896, and Zivi-Hercules, another Brazilian company, founded in Porto Alegre in 1931.

Eberle began by producing tin oil lamps in Caxias do Sul, an industrial city located in the southernmost state of Brazil. Over time the company expanded into the manufacturing of horse riding gear, tableware, cutlery, motors and fasteners, and by 1974 was producing beauty implements and fashion apparel fasteners. After its 2003 merger with Zivi, the group was renamed Mundial S.A.

It is a publicly traded company, with shares trading daily at the São Paulo Stock Exchange (BM&F Bovespa).

References 

Manufacturing companies established in 1896
Companies listed on B3 (stock exchange)
Manufacturing companies based in São Paulo
Brazilian brands
1896 establishments in Brazil